Rigak (also Romanized as Rīgak) is a village in Poshtkuh Rural District, in the Central District of Ardal County, Chaharmahal and Bakhtiari Province, Iran. At the 2006 census, its population was 117, in 19 families.

References 

Populated places in Ardal County